Phragmataecia saccharum is a species of moth of the family Cossidae. It is found in India.

References

Moths described in 1879
Phragmataecia